There are at least 13 named lakes and reservoirs in Cleveland County, Arkansas.

Lakes
 Wilson Lake, el.  
 Upper Canada Lake, el.  
 Lower Canada Lake, el.  
 Gray's Lake, el.  
 Crane Lake, el.

Reservoirs
 Van Sadler Lake, el.  
 Studdard Lake, el.  
 Schultz Lake, el.  
 Larson Lake, el.  
 Lake Elrod, el.  
 Kesterson Lake, el.  
 Dunkeffie Lake, el.  
 Clements Pond, el.

See also
 List of lakes in Arkansas

Notes

Bodies of water of Cleveland County, Arkansas
Cleveland